Igor Gennadyevich Cherevchenko (born 21 August 1974) is a football manager and a former player who represented Tajikistan. He is the head coach of Istiklol.

Coaching career
He signed a contract with Russian Premier League club FC Arsenal Tula on 13 November 2018. He led Arsenal to the UEFA Europa League qualification for the first time in club's history at the end of the 2018–19 season.

He resigned from Arsenal on 1 July 2020 following 5 consecutive league losses.

On 25 September 2020, he was hired by Russian Premier League club FC Khimki. He left Khimki by mutual consent on 25 October 2021. On 19 November 2021, he was re-hired by Khimki. On 22 February 2022, he left Khimki by mutual consent once again.

On 18 January 2023, Cherevchenko was appointed as the new head coach of Tajikistan champions Istiklol on a one-year contract.

Career statistics

International

Statistics accurate as of 12 November 2014.

Honours

Player honours
Pamir Dushanbe
Tajik League: 1992
Tajik Cup: 1992

Lokomotiv Moscow
Russian Cup: 1996, 1997, 2000, 2001.

Managerial honours
Lokomotiv Moscow
Russian Cup: 2014–15

References

External links
 
 

1974 births
Living people
Tajikistani people of Ukrainian descent
Sportspeople from Dushanbe
Tajikistani footballers
CSKA Pamir Dushanbe players
FC Torpedo Moscow players
FC Lokomotiv Moscow players
FC Spartak Vladikavkaz players
Russian Premier League players
Tajikistan international footballers
Tajikistani expatriate footballers
Expatriate footballers in Russia
Tajikistani football managers
FC Lokomotiv Moscow managers
Russian Premier League managers
FC Baltika Kaliningrad managers
FC Arsenal Tula managers
Tajikistani people of Russian descent
Association football defenders
FC Khimki managers